Yitzhaq II ben Amram ben Shalma ben Tabia was the 121st Samaritan High Priest from 1916–1932. He is the progenitor of the house of Yitzhaq, one of the three houses of Samaritan High Priests.

Gallery

References

1855 births
1932 deaths
Samaritan high priests